Harold Parks Helms (November 5, 1935 – March 18, 2023) was an American politician. He served as a Democratic member of the North Carolina House of Representatives.

Life and career 
Helms was born in Charlotte, North Carolina, the son of Ida Parks and Wade H. Helms. He attended Charlotte Technical High School, the University of North Carolina at Chapel Hill and the University of North Carolina School of Law.

In 1974, Helms was elected to the North Carolina House of Representatives, serving until 1984. In 1988, he was a candidate for lieutenant governor of North Carolina.

References 

1935 births
2023 deaths
Politicians from Charlotte, North Carolina
Democratic Party members of the North Carolina House of Representatives
20th-century American politicians
University of North Carolina at Chapel Hill alumni
University of North Carolina School of Law alumni